Tom Lindsey is a Canadian politician who represents the riding of Flin Flon in the Legislative Assembly of Manitoba since 2016. He is a member of the Manitoba New Democratic Party.

Biography 
Born in Southern Saskatchewan, Lindsey moved to Flin Flon in 1974. Lindsey has been a member of the New Democratic Party since the 1970s. A member of the Manitoba New Democratic Party, Lindsey defeated incumbent independent MLA Clarence Pettersen in the 2016 general election.

Lindsey was reelected in the 2019 election with an increased majority. In the Legislative Assembly, Lindsey serves as the Official Opposition’s Critic for Labour, Resource Development and Northern Affairs.

Electoral history

References 

New Democratic Party of Manitoba MLAs
21st-century Canadian politicians
Year of birth missing (living people)
Living people